The Musée du Barreau de Paris is a French museum dedicated to the history of the Paris Bar and its lawyers. It is located close to the Église Saint-Eustache, in the 1st arrondissement of Paris, at 25 rue du Jour, Paris, and opens for groups, on appointment. A guided visit in English can be organised on request. An entrance fee is charged.

The museum occupies the vaulted cellars of the 17th century Hôtel de la Porte, named after its owner, Antoine de la Porte (1641-1697), fresh fish merchant and town magistrate of Paris, and restored in 1980-1981. Its collections include items that reflect legal history from the 17th century to the present (1960's), including manuscripts and exhibits from the trials of Louis XVI, Marie Antoinette, Émile Zola at the Dreyfus affair, Michel Ney, Pierre Cambronne, Raoul Villain(assassin of Jean Jaurès), and Alexandre Stavisky. It also has a fine collection of notes of oral arguments by lawyers including Claude François Chauveau-Lagarde (defender of Marie Antoinette), Fernand Labori (defender of Zola), Léon Gambetta, Raymond Poincaré, and Jacques Isorni (lawyer for Marshal Philippe Pétain). It contains numerous works of art related to the Paris Bar, including paintings, sculptures, prints, and photographs.

See also 
 List of museums in Paris

References 

 Evene.fr entry 
 UGCE description

External links
 Le Musée du Barreau de Paris

Museums in Paris
Law enforcement museums in France
Buildings and structures in the 1st arrondissement of Paris